Mack Avenue Records is an independent record label in Grosse Pointe Farms, Michigan.

Background
Mack Avenue was founded in 1999 by Gretchen Carhartt Valade, a jazz fan and chair of the American apparel company Carhartt. The company is a sponsor of the Detroit Jazz Festival, to which Gretchen Valade donated $15 million in 2006.

Early Mack recording artists included Terry Gibbs, Oscar Castro-Neves, and George Shearing. Over time Mack Avenue signed veteran jazz musicians such as Gary Burton, Kevin Eubanks, Stanley Jordan, Christian McBride, Gerald Wilson, and the Yellowjackets. Acquisitions made in 2008 expanded the label's catalogue into additional genres, such as the blues, gospel, and rhythm and blues (R&B), with Jonathan Butler, Brian Bromberg, Rick Braun, Richard Elliot, and Kenny Rankin. Mack Avenue's recording artists have earned multiple Grammy awards and nominations.

In 2016, Mack Avenue expanded its catalog when it acquired MAXJAZZ.

External links

Discogs label entry

References

Jazz record labels
American independent record labels
Record labels based in Michigan
Companies based in Wayne County, Michigan
1999 establishments in Michigan
Smooth jazz record labels